KDE.News (KDE Dot News) is the official news website for the KDE free software community. It includes KDE development and user news, discussions, and feature articles. Most stories are summaries of things published elsewhere; some are interviews with KDE developers. The site also includes links to recent software releases and developers' weblog postings.

The site formerly used the Squishdot content management system, but migrated to Drupal in January 2009.

References

Linux websites
KDE